Meydan-e Jigh-e Kuchak (also Romanized as Meydān-e Jīgh-e Kūchak; also known as Meydān-e Jīq-e Kūchak) is a village in Maraveh Tappeh Rural District, in the Central District of Maraveh Tappeh County, Golestan Province, Iran. At the 2006 census, its population was 32, in 6 families.

References 

Populated places in Maraveh Tappeh County